The Great Synagogue in Bucharest, Romania was raised in 1845 by the Polish-Jewish community. 

It was repaired in 1865, redesigned in 1903 and 1909, repainted in Rococo style in 1936 by Ghershon Horowitz, then it was restored again in 1945, as it had been devastated by the far-right Legionnaires.  

It still hosts weekend religious services, being one of the few active synagogues in the city. Former Rabbi was Dr. Moses Rosen.

See also
 History of the Jews in Romania.
 List of synagogues in Romania.

Ashkenazi Jewish culture in Romania
Ashkenazi synagogues
Synagogues in Bucharest
Synagogues preserved as museums
Synagogues completed in 1845
Religious organizations established in 1845
1845 establishments in Wallachia
Polish diaspora in Europe
Polish-Jewish diaspora